Just Visiting This Planet is the second album by Jellybean, the nickname for American producer, remixer and songwriter John Benitez. The album was released in 1987 and contains the singles "Who Found Who", "The Real Thing", "Jingo" and "Just a Mirage".

In 2012, the album was remastered and expanded by Cherry Red Records. It featured five remixes, including a remix of the song "Sidewalk Talk", which was originally released as a single in 1985 and is written by Madonna, who also provides backing vocals.

Critical reception

Reviewing the reissue, Record Collector wrote that while "the synth stabs, LinnDrum gloops and crashing beats sometimes date the set, tracks such as 'Walking In My Sleep' [are] quintessential exercises in 80s New York studio excess."

Track listing

Personnel
Adapted from the Just Visiting This Planet liner notes.

Musicians

Linden Aaron – Simmons drums
Adele Bertei – lead vocals, backing vocals, rap, vocal arrangement
Dave "Rev" Boruff – saxophone
Jocelyn Brown – backing vocals
David Bryant – synthesizers
Toni C. – drum programming, synthesizers, arranger, vocal arrangement
Felicia Collins – guitar
Paulinho da Costa – percussion
Steven Dante – lead vocals, rap
Carol Dennis – backing vocals
Elisa Fiorillo – lead vocals, vocal arrangement
Paul Fox – synthesizers
Siedah Garrett – backing vocals, vocal arrangement
Jellybean – drum programming, percussion, backing vocals, synthesizers, arranger, vocal arrangement
Connie Harvey – backing vocals
Paul Jackson Jr. – guitar
Bashiri Johnson – percussion
Mary Kessler – synthesizers, arranger
Edie Lehmann – backing vocals
Eddie Martinez – guitar, rhythm guitar
Jimmy Maelen – percussion
Cindy Mizelle – backing vocals
Wendell Morrison – backing vocals
Paul Pesco – guitar solo
Darryl Phinnessee – backing vocals
Bob Quaranta – piano
Carmine Rojas – bass guitar
Frank Simms – backing vocals
Neil Stubenhaus – bass guitar
Fonzi Thornton – backing vocals
Maxine Waters – backing vocals
Audrey Wheeler – backing vocals
David Williams – guitar
Dweezil Zappa – electric guitar
Fred Zarr – synthesizers, arranger

Production
Produced by Jellybean for Jellybean Productions, Inc.
Mix engineer: Michael Hutchinson
Additional engineers: Joe Chiccarelli, Jay Mark, JC Convertino, Ed Thacker, Mark Roule, Gordon Fordyce
Assistant engineers: Don Feinberg, Nick Delre, Mark Roule, Craig Vogel, Jeff Lorezen, John Hedges, Mark McKenna
Production coordinator: Doreen Dorion
A&R coordinators: Jeff Aldrich & Susan Collins
Originally mastered by: George Marino at Sterling Sound, New York City
Direction: Brendan Bourke for BB Management
Art direction & design: Norman Moore
Photography: Phillip Dixon

Charts and certifications

Weekly charts

Certifications

References

External links
Just Visiting This Planet at Discogs

1987 albums
Chrysalis Records albums
Albums recorded at Sigma Sound Studios
Albums recorded at A&M Studios